Thomas Holme (1624–1695) was the first Surveyor General of Pennsylvania. He laid out the first and original plan for the city of Philadelphia.

Holme was one of the Valiant Sixty, a group of early leaders and activists in the Religious Society of Friends (Quakers).

Life
Holme was born in Lancashire, England, on November 3, 1624, to a yeoman named George and his wife Alice (née Whiteside). He married Sarah Croft in 1649, and soon enlisted in the army under the leadership of Oliver Cromwell, where he attained the rank of captain. It may have been in the army that he gained some experience in surveying. After retiring he was granted more than 4,000 acres (16 km²) in County Wexford, Ireland, which was then under the control and colonization of England.

At some point he joined the Quaker movement in Ireland, reputedly converted by George Fox, founder of the sect. There he met fellow Quaker William Penn, founder of Pennsylvania. In 1682, Penn wrote to Holme from the colony asking him to come be his surveyor, since his original surveyor, Captain William Crispin, had recently become ill and died on the voyage to America. Shortly thereafter, Holme, a widower, sailed with four of his children to America, where he arrived in August 1682.

Holme designed the plan of the city of Philadelphia and produced the first detailed map of Pennsylvania, entitled "A Mapp of Ye Improved Part of Pensilvania in America, Divided Into Countyes, Townships and Lotts...." (published circa 1687). On Penn's arrival in the colony, he appointed Holme as one of his councilors. Holme also served as a justice of the peace and commissioner of property.

Holme held the office of Surveyor-General until his death at age 71 in the spring of 1695, in Dublin Township, Philadelphia County (now the Holmesburg section of the city of Philadelphia). In 1863, a memorial was erected at his burial site, in the form of a six-foot-tall marble obelisk, near where his home is believed to have been located, now part of Pennypack Park.

Legacy
Philadelphia's Holme Avenue, Holme Circle, Thomas Holme Elementary School, and Holmesburg, a Philadelphia neighborhood, are all named in his honor.

See also
Nicholas Scull II
Numbered streets

References

Further reading

Hough, Oliver, "Captain Thomas Holme, Surveyor-General of Pennsylvania and Provincial Councillor," The Pennsylvania Magazine of History and Biography, Vol. XIX & XX, 1895 & 1896.

External links

 http://archives.profsurv.com/magazine/article.aspx?i=711
 Biographical essay in Professional Surveyor magazine:
Part 1
Part 2
 Image of one of Holme's maps from the Lower Merion Historical Society
 "Portraiture of the City of Philadelphia" (1683), by Thomas Holme
 Brief biography at virtualology.com

1624 births
1695 deaths
People of colonial Pennsylvania
American Quakers
Converts to Quakerism
People from Lancashire (before 1974)
Roundheads
17th-century Quakers
History of Philadelphia
American cartographers
English emigrants